The 102nd Infantry Regiment currently consists of one battalion in the Connecticut National Guard. In the modern U.S. Army regimental system, regimental designation is used only in historical tradition, and there is no regimental headquarters or staff. It is one of several National Guard units with colonial roots. The 1st Battalion, 102nd Regiment is headquartered in New Haven, Connecticut. Its mascot is Sergeant Stubby.

Service history

World War I
In August 1917, the Regiment was organized with 3,755 Officers and enlisted men:
 Headquarters & Headquarters Company- 303
 Supply Company- 140
 Machine Gun Company- 178
 Medical & Chaplain Detachment- 56
 Infantry Battalion (x3)- 1,026 
 Headquarters- 2
 Rifle Company (x4)- 256

The 102nd was stationed at the Neufchateau, Vosges Training Area during the fall and winter of 1917 with the 26th Division also known as the Yankee Division which included the 101st, 103rd and 104th infantry regiments.

They were then deployed in March 1918 to the Chemin des Dames area 
where the men had their first experience with defensive and offensive
operations and with poison gas.

Next they were deployed in April 1918 to the Toul Sector in the American sector 
near the Beaumont Zone. They fought at Seicheprey.

Next the 102nd was deployed in July 1918 to the Chateau Thierry area 
and were involved in the battles of the 
Champagne-Marne, 
Aisne-Marne
and the Second Battle of the Marne (15 July – 6 August).
They fought at Trugny, Épieds, and the La Fere Forest.

Next the 102nd was deployed to Saint-Mihiel fighting at the Battle of Saint-Mihiel, then the Troyon Sector and finally at Verdun.

After completing its war service in France with the 26th Division, the Regiment arrived at the port of Boston on 7 April 1919 on the U.S.S. Agamemnon and demobilized at Camp Devens, Massachusetts on 29 April 1919.

Between the Wars
 The regiment was reconstituted in the National Guard in 1921 as the 170th Infantry, assigned to the 43d Infantry Division, and allotted to the state of Connecticut. It was reorganized on 20 October 1922 by withdrawal of the 2d Infantry Regiment, Connecticut National Guard, from the 169th Infantry Regiment (organized 23 May 1921 by consolidation and redesignation of the 1st and 2d Infantry Regiments as the Connecticut Regiment of Infantry; redesignated 169th Inf. on 7 October 1921) and redesignating it as the 170th Infantry. Regimental Headquarters organized 8 June 1923 and federally recognized at New Haven, Connecticut.

The 170th Infantry was redesignated as the 102d Infantry on 28 February 1924. The regiment, or elements thereof, were called up to perform the following state duties: riot control at the textile workers strike at Putnam, in September 1934; flood relief at Hartford from 19 March – 1 April 1936; hurricane relief in the vicinity of Rockville from 22–27 September 1938. The Regiment conducted annual summer training most years at Niantic between 1921–38. Inducted into active Federal service at New Haven on 24 February 1941 and moved to Camp Blanding, Florida, where it arrived 15 March 1941.

World War II
 
When the United States reorganised their divisions from the four regiment square division to the three regiment triangular division. The 102nd was detached from the 43rd Division and sent to New Zealand in January 1942.  The regiment garrisoned Christmas Island and Canton Island

In July 1943, the Regiment was organized with 3,256 Officers and enlisted men:
 Headquarters & Headquarters Company- 111
 Service Company- 114
 Anti-Tank Company- 165
 Cannon Company- 118
 Medical Detachment- 135
 Infantry Battalion (x3)- 871 
 Headquarters & Headquarters Company- 126
 Rifle Company (x3)- 193
 Weapons Company- 156

Post War Service
The 1948 organization of the Regiment TOE 29-7T called for a strength of 3,774 Officers and enlisted men organized as below:
 Headquarters & Headquarters Company- 289
 Service Company- 186
 Tank Company- 148
 Heavy Mortar Company- 190
 Medical Company- 214
 Infantry Battalion (x3)
 Headquarters & Headquarters Company- 119
 Rifle Company (x3)- 211
 Weapons Company- 165

Global War on Terrorism
 
In 2005, the battalion mobilized at Fort Bragg and then deployed in early 2006 to Afghanistan in support of Operation Enduring Freedom.  The companies supported Provincial Reconstruction Teams (PRT's) across Afghanistan. 

In 2006, the 86th Infantry Brigade Combat Team (Mountain) was reorganized from a "heavy" brigade to a specialized light infantry formation. The 1–102nd Infantry was added as the brigade slowly formed from 2006, transitioning to the 42d Infantry Division.

The 86th IBCT mobilized in December 2009 at Camp Atterbury, Indiana and completed a Joint Readiness Training Center rotation at Fort Polk prior to deployment in support of Operation Enduring Freedom. The brigade returned home in December 2010 after being replaced by 2nd IBCT, 34th ID.

Current Assignment
 As part of the 2020 Army Force Structure Realignment, the 86th IBCT – which includes the 1-102d IN – was moved in 2016 from the 42d ID to the 10th Mountain division.

Lineage
Organized 26 June in the Connecticut Militia as Regiment of New Haven County
Reorganized as the 2nd Regimental Militia on 11 October 1739 from existing companies in the Connecticut Colony
Reorganized in 1816 and again in 1847 without material change
Organized as the 2nd Connecticut Volunteers on 7 May 1861 and mustered out on 7 August 1861
Organized as the 20th Connecticut Volunteers on 8 September 1862 and mustered out 13 June 1865
Reorganized as the 2nd Infantry in 1865
Redesignated as the 58th Pioneer Infantry and 102nd Infantry Regiment on 22 August 1917 and assigned to the PDCA Troops and 26th Infantry Division, respectively
Demobilized as the 58th Pioneer Infantry 8 January 1919 at Camp Wadsworth, South Carolina
Reconstituted in the National Guard on 25 November 1921, assigned to the 43rd Division, and allotted to the state of Connecticut 
Reorganized on 23 May 1921 by consolidation and redesignation of the 1st and 2nd Infantry Regiments as the Connecticut Regiment of Infantry
Redesignated as the 169th Infantry Regiment on 7 October 1921
Lineage of 2nd Infantry Regiment withdrawn from the 169th Infantry Regiment to form the 170th Infantry Regiment (hereafter separate lineage)
Redesignated 102nd Infantry Regiment on 28 February 1924
Relieved from the 43rd Infantry Division and consolidated with the 963rd Field Artillery Battalion to form the 102nd Infantry on 1 May 1959

References
 Connecticut Adjutant General's Report – 1930

External links
Connecticut fights; the story of the 102nd regiment, by Captain Daniel W. Strickland. Pub. 1930 
New England in France, 1917–1919: A History of the Twenty-sixth Division, U. S. A. by Emerson Gifford Taylor, pub. 1920, 325 pages.

102
Military units and formations established in 1917
Military units and formations in Connecticut
Military in Connecticut
102